The Chunsa Film Art Awards (Korean: 춘사국제영화제; also known as The 26th Chunsa International Film Festival) have been hosted by the Korean Film Directors Association, since the 1990s to commemorate the Korean film pioneer Chunsa Na Woon-gyu. Previously known as Chunsa Film Festival, it was announced that it will become an international film festival this year.

Themed as 'A New Birth of Cinema', The 26th Chunsa International Film Festival was to be held on August 27, but due to surge in COVID-19 pandemic, it was postponed for November 19, 2021. In this edition, 23 films were nominated for the main awards in 10 categories. Over-the-top (OTT) original films were also included in the nominations, such as the Netflix films Space Sweepers, The Call and Night in Paradise.

The awards ceremony on 19 November was hosted by pop columnist Kim Tae-hoon. The Grand Prix best director award was won by Jo Sung-hee for  Space Sweepers. The film also won the best actor award for Song Joong-ki.

Selection committee
 Kim Jong-won (film critic)
 Kim Hyung-seok (film journalist and Pyeongchang International Peace Film Festival programmer)
 Nam Dong-cheol (Busan International Film Festival program director and former editor of Cine21) 
 Seo Gok-suk (Seoul Film Council chairwoman)
 Yang Kyung-mi (film critic and director of Korea Institute for Film & Media Contents Industry)
 Baek Jae-wook (YouTube creator)

The nominations go through a judging committee consisting of directors to decide the final list of nominations.

Winners and nominees 
The nominees for the 26th Chunsa Film Art Awards were announced on July 5, 2021.

Films with multiple nominations and wins
The following films received multiple nominations:

See also 

57th Baeksang Arts Awards
41st Blue Dragon Film Awards
29th Buil Film Awards

References

External links
 
 Chunsa Film Art Award 2021 at IMDb 
 Chunsa Film Art Awards at Daum 

2021 film awards
South Korean film awards
Annual events in South Korea
2021 in South Korean cinema
Events in Seoul
Events postponed due to the COVID-19 pandemic